Daniel Charles Oliver (October 6, 1865 – March 26, 1924) was an American businessman and politician who served one term as an American politician from New York from 1917 and 1919.

Life
Born in New York City, Oliver attended public schools and graduated from the College of the City of New York. He served twenty years as a member of the school board. He was an importer of dry goods and also served as member of the Commercial Travelers' Association.

Political career 
He was a member of the New York State Assembly (New York Co., 23rd D.) in 1915 and 1916.

Congress 
Oliver was elected as a Democrat to the 65th United States Congress, holding office from March 4, 1917, to March 3, 1919. He resumed his former business pursuits in New York City.

Death 
He died from pneumonia at his home there on March 26, 1924. He was buried at the Calvary Cemetery in Woodside, Queens.

Sources

External links

1865 births
1924 deaths
American Roman Catholics
Burials at Calvary Cemetery (Queens)
Democratic Party members of the New York State Assembly
New York University alumni
Democratic Party members of the United States House of Representatives from New York (state)